is a Japanese football player. He plays for MOF Customs.

Playing career
Masaya Jitozono played for SC Sagamihara from 2012 to 2015. In 2016, he moved to Albirex Niigata Singapore.

Club career statistics

References

External links

1989 births
Living people
Aoyama Gakuin University alumni
Association football people from Chiba Prefecture
Japanese footballers
J3 League players
Japan Football League players
SC Sagamihara players
Association football midfielders